The 1993 Grand Prix de Tennis de Lyon was a men's tennis tournament played on indoor carpet courts at the Palais des Sports de Gerland in Lyon, France, and was part of the World Series of the 1993 ATP Tour. It was the seventh edition of the tournament and took place from 18 October through 25  October 1993. First-seeded Pete Sampras won the singles title, his third consecutive at the event.

Finals

Singles

 Pete Sampras defeated  Cédric Pioline 7–6(7–5), 1–6, 7–5
 It was Sampras' 7th title of the year and the 20th of his career.

Doubles

 Gary Muller /  Danie Visser defeated  John-Laffnie de Jager /  Stefan Kruger 6–3, 7–6
 It was Muller's only title of the year and the 6th of his career. It was Visser's 3rd title of the year and the 16th of his career.

References

External links
 ITF tournament edition details

Grand Prix de Tennis de Lyon
Open Sud de France
Grand Prix de Tennis de Lyon